On Practice is one of Mao Zedong's most important philosophical works. Along with On Contradiction, this essay is a part of lectures Mao gave in 1937. It expresses Mao's support for Marxism and attempts to establish a distinctly Chinese brand of communist philosophy. At the time it was written, the Chinese Communist Party had just endured the Long March and their nationalist foes were still at large. Plus, China was facing a tremendous Japanese threat. Mao hoped to establish himself as the leader of China's communist party in order to unite China and vanquish the Japanese. On Practice was written as a part of this mission, for it gave Mao a more legitimate claim to lead by creating the basis for his communist philosophy, Maoism.

Philosophical argument
On Practice explains Mao Zedong's philosophy concerning the acquisition of knowledge. In this text, Mao follows in the footsteps of Marx and Lenin, endorsing the dialectical-materialist philosophy that knowledge is wrought through practice. Mao stresses the understanding of political and cultural life, in addition to the material focus of Marx.  With the help of historical and other examples, Mao explains the dialectical-materialist process, breaking it down into comprehensible parts. The process begins with the acquisition of logical knowledge, which happens in three stages, perception, cognition, and conception. Once these steps finish, people must apply their logical knowledge to reality through practice in order to verify the truth-value of their conceptions. True knowledge is logical knowledge that, when practiced, successfully directs people to their desired end. According to Mao, other philosophies fail to recognize the importance of practice, and only through this dialectical-materialism can the Chinese people experience progress.

According to Mao, logical knowledge results from the process of perceiving, cognizing, and conceptualizing. During the stage of perception individuals spend time interacting with the subject of their enquiry, and they merely absorb the impressions their senses are giving them.  This stage allows people to become familiar with the matter they are interested in, for as they gather impressions individuals begin to recognize the essential elements of their subject. For instance, an individual observing trees comes to understand that trees do not always bear leaves. They realize birds use some trees as their home. Additionally, useful impressions can be derived from indirect experiences of a phenomenon. According to Mao, an indirect experience is just a direct experience of some other person's impressions. Therefore, indirect impressions still gather genuine information about a subject. Impressions eventually lead to the second step toward rational knowledge, cognition. At this point, individuals establish some general notions about their subject using the essential aspects that were impressed upon them. From there individuals begin conceptualizing; they use their reason to make judgments with the general notions their impressions supplied. These judgments are pieces of logical knowledge. They can be as mundane as judging that many trees lose their leaves during the winter, and as significant as Mao's example, the Chinese Communist Party can defeat their Japanese opposition.

All logical knowledge must be put to practice in order to substantiate its truth-value. Logical knowledge requires this testing because of its circumstantial founding.  Impressions, the origin of logical knowledge, are based upon the circumstances someone experiences. Circumstances change. Therefore, logical knowledge is subject to error. However, by putting their logically founded judgments into practice an individual can address the errors in their ideas. Practice does this by presenting individuals with new impressions, for practice involves interacting with the phenomenon being examined. These new impressions are used in the same way the older ones were. They inform judgments.  The only difference is that these judgments are about the truth-value of the original logical knowledge.

True knowledge leads to the successful completion of an objective, and is derived from the continual amendment of logical knowledge. A piece of logical knowledge usually undergoes many changes before it can be called true knowledge, for the circumstances surrounding a certain objective can always change. These changes conjure new impressions that disprove older judgments. For instance, a married couple will have to adjust their plan to buy a house according to the strength of the housing market. The fiscal requirements for buying the house will change with the market, so the couple's plan will have to adhere to those changes. However, once the couple understands the fiscal requirements and their financial means are able, they can buy the house. In the same way all logical knowledge can become true knowledge. Said simply, for this to happen an individual must cognize the correct circumstances. This reliance on circumstances is exactly why practice is such an essential element of knowledge, for through practice an individual's ideas are constantly accounting for more circumstances while testing the assumptions of prior knowledge. Therefore, they can eventually encounter the circumstances that can catalyze true knowledge.

According to Mao, rationalists and empiricists do not follow the real path to knowledge, and he challenges these dissenters inability to recognize the proper use of practice. Rationalists do not recognize that interacting with reality is essential to understanding it. Without sensory impressions and tests how can you be sure a theory corresponds to reality? A rationalist might say because the theory makes sense. However, it makes sense that a bird walking across the street prefers walking to flying. The only way to reveal the true reason for the creature walking, a broken wing, is by observing it. An empiricist understands the importance of observing phenomenon. Mao thinks, they know that practice is important, but they do not know what to do with the information they have gathered from practice. Therefore, they cannot extract the essence of their impressions and therefore, cannot make useful judgments. Dialectical-materialism combines the perception empiricists hold dear with the cognition rationalists rely on, and as a result is the proper philosophy for attaining knowledge. Knowledge that the Chinese and all the peoples of the world can use to progress communism.

See also
Seek truth from facts

References

1937 essays
Contemporary philosophical literature
Ideology of the Chinese Communist Party
Works by Mao Zedong